Charles R. Nagreen (2 May 1870 – 5 June 1951), known as "Hamburger Charlie", was an American claimant to the title of inventor of the hamburger.

Career
Born in Hortonville, Wisconsin, Nagreen was a 15-year-old vendor at the 1885 Seymour Fair. After not experiencing success selling meatballs, he had an idea. Knowing that the visitors to the fair would be hungry after gazing at the exhibits but wouldn't be able to walk and eat, he smashed a meatball and placed it between two slices of bread. His idea was a success, and he returned every year until his death in Appleton, Wisconsin, in 1951.

Controversy
The name of the hamburger came from the idea of "Hamburg steak", or ground beef. Since this was a popular item in Seymour at the time of the 1885 fair, Nagreen decided to call the sandwich the "Hamburger". This version of events is supported by local history organizations.

References

External links
  Charles Nagreen at Find a Grave.

1870 births
1951 deaths
People from Hortonville, Wisconsin
Hamburgers (food)
American chefs
American male chefs